The 2017 season will be Žalgiris 8th consecutive season in the top flight of Lithuanian football and 4th consecutive as A Lyga title defenders. They will also participate in the Lithuanian Cup, SuperCup and enter the UEFA Champions League at the second qualifying round stage.

Season overview

Pre-season

Players

Transfers

Winter 2017

In

Out

Summer 2017

In

Out

Pre-season and friendlies

Competitions

Lithuanian Supercup

A Lyga

Results summary

Results by round

Regular season

League table

Matches

LFF Taurė

UEFA Champions League

Second qualifying round

Statistics

Appearances and goals

|-
! colspan=14 style=background:#dcdcdc; text-align:center| Goalkeepers

|-
! colspan=14 style=background:#dcdcdc; text-align:center| Defenders

|-
! colspan=14 style=background:#dcdcdc; text-align:center| Midfielders

|-
! colspan=14 style=background:#dcdcdc; text-align:center| Forwards

|-
! colspan=14 style=background:#dcdcdc; text-align:center| Players transferred out during the season

Goalscorers

Clean sheets

Disciplinary record

References

FK Žalgiris seasons
Žalgiris
Žalgiris